Scythris vogelfederbergensis is a moth of the family Scythrididae. It was described by Wolfram Mey in 2011. It is found in Namibia.

References

vogelfederbergensis
Moths described in 2011